Francesco Gonzaga may refer to:

Francesco I Gonzaga (1366–1407), Lord of Mantua
Gianfrancesco I Gonzaga, Marquess of Mantua (1395–1444)
Francesco Gonzaga (1444–1483), cardinal
Gianfrancesco Gonzaga (1446–1496), Count of Sabbioneta
Francesco II Gonzaga, Marquess of Mantua (1466–1519)
Francesco III Gonzaga, Duke of Mantua (1533–1550)
Francesco Gonzaga (1538–1566), cardinal
Francesco IV Gonzaga, Duke of Mantua (1586–1612)
Francesco Gonzaga (bishop of Nola) (1602–1673)
Francesco Gonzaga (bishop of Mantua) (died 1620)

See also
 House of Gonzaga